Ogun or Ogoun (Yoruba: Ògún, Portuguese: Ogum, Gu; also spelled Oggun or Ogou; known as Ogún or Ogum in Latin America) is a spirit that appears in several African religions. He attempted to seize the throne after the demise of Obatala, who reigned twice, before and after Oduduwa, but was ousted by Obamakin (Obalufon Ogbogbodirin) and sent on an exile – an event that serves as the core of the Olojo Festival. Ogun is a warrior and a powerful spirit of metal work, as well as of rum and rum-making. He is also known as the "god of iron" and is present in Yoruba religion, Haitian Vodou, and West African Vodun.

Yoruba religion

In Yoruba religion, Ogun is a primordial orisha in Yoruba Land. In some traditions, he is said to have cleared a path for the other orisha to enter Earth, using a metal axe and with the assistance of a dog. To commemorate this, one of his praise names, or oriki, is Osin Imole or the "first of the primordial Orisha to come to Earth". He is the god of war and metals.

In his earthly life Ogun is said to be the first king of Ife. When some of his subjects failed to show respect, Ogun killed them and ultimately himself with his own sword. He disappeared into the earth at a place called Ire-Ekiti, with the promise to help those who call on his name. His followers believe him to have wo ile sun, to have disappeared into the earth's surface instead of dying. Throughout his earthly life, he is thought to have fought for the people of Ire, thus is known also as Onire.

He is now celebrated in Ogun, Ekiti, Oyo, and Ondo States.

Followers

Ogun is the traditional deity of warriors, hunters, blacksmiths, technologists, and drivers in the Yoruba region. Followers of traditional Yoruba religion can swear to tell the truth in court by "kissing a piece of iron in the name of Ogun." Drivers carry an amulet of Ogun to ward off traffic accidents.

Symbols

The primary symbols of Ogun are iron, the dog, and the palm frond. They symbolize Ogun's role in transformation, mediation, and function. Iron is the primary emblem of Ogun. Ogun altars and ceremonies display and use iron objects both in Yoruba areas and across the African diaspora. Followers of Ogun wear chains of iron implements; Ogun festivals feature the display of knives, guns, blacksmith implements, scissors, wrenches, and other iron implements from daily life.

Sacrifice
Meats are sacrifices for Ogun. Dogs are the traditional companions of hunters, but Ogun's personality is also seen as "doglike": aggressive, able to face danger, and straightforward. Other sacrificial animals associated with Ogun are the spitting cobra (blacksnake); its behavior is aggressive and fearless. Hunters and blacksmiths avoid eating or witnessing the mating of blacksnakes. Other important sacrificial offerings to Ogun are the Clarias submarginatus (a species of catfish), alligator pepper, kola nuts, palm wine and red palm oil, small rats, roosters, salt, snails, tortoise, water, and yams. (Clyne: 1997). Many of these sacrificial offerings were carried into New World traditions.

Oríkì is a Yoruba cultural phenomenon that comes in the form of praise poetry, praising either a person, òrìṣà (deity), or town based on their achievements. Ogun worshippers are known to sing Ogun's oríkì and this specific part insinuates that Ògún is in seven paths. 

Ògún méje logun mi,
Ògún alára ni n gb’aja,
Ògún onire a gb’àgbò,
Ògún Ikọla a gb'agbín,
Ògún gbengbena oje ìgí nìí mu,
Ògún ila a gb’esun iṣu,
Ògún akirin a gb’awo agbo,
Ògún elémono ẹran ahùn ni jẹ,
mákindé ti dogun lẹyin odi,
Bi o ba gba Tapa a gb’Aboki,
A gba Ukuuku a gba Kèmbèrí.

Translation:

My Ògún manifest in seven different ways
Ogun of the town of Ilara accepts a dog atonement
Ogun of the town of Ire accepts a ram atonement
Ogun of the town of Ikole accepts a snail atonement
Ogun of Gbenagena drinks tree sap for atonement
Ogun of the town of Ila accept yam seeds atonement
Ogun of the Akirin people accepts ram fur atonement
Ogun of the Elemono people eats tortoise meat for atonement
The brave that wages foreign wars
He will consume either Nupe, or Hausa
He consumes foreign people, He will consume the Kanuri too.

Dahomey religion

In Dahomey religion, Gu is the vodun of war and patron deity of smiths and craftsmen. He was sent to earth to make it a nice place for people to live, and he has not yet finished this task.

Ewe religion

In Ewe religion, Gu also pronounced Egu is the god of war and craftsmen especially blacksmiths. Worshippers of Gu are not supposed to keep dogs as pets. Menstruating women are forbidden to touch the tools of the blacksmith. Adherents periodically make offerings of palm nuts, food and pour libations to Gu.

Candomblé

Ogun is known in the Afro-Brazilian tradition of Candomblé as Ogum (Ketu, Ijexa and Efon nations) or Gu (Jeje nation). Ogum is syncretized with Saint George, notably in Rio de Janeiro and the state of Rio Grande do Sul. Candomblé tradition in Northeast Brazil, especially in Bahia, associates Ogum with Saint Sebastian or Saint Anthony.

Characteristics
Consecrated day: Wednesday
Metal: iron
Element: earth
Color: red, black, green (Rio de Janeiro), blue (Bahia), marine blue
Food: feijoada, xinxim, yams
Archetype: impetuous, authoritarian, cautious, hardworking, suspicious and a bit selfish
Symbols: sword, broadsword, iron chain

Individual devotees of Ogun in Brazil avoid certain foods. These include goat, cajá-manga (Spondias dulcis), sugar, black beans, yams, and the manga-espada (an elongated mango cultivar of Brazil) in the Ketu nation; yams and manga-espada in the Ijexa nation; and partridge in the Jeje nation.

Ritual sacrifice

Ogun, as a male orisha (Boró), only "eats" male animals. Ox, billy goat, rooster, snake (typically a red snake), dog and game animals are sacrificed ("orô") on festival days associated with Ogum in the Candomblé tradition.

Ritual foods

Acaçá is a ritual food offered to all gods in the Candomble pantheon; it is made of a paste of corn mash steamed in banana leaves. A variation, acaçá de feijão-preto, substitutes black beans (Phaseolus vulgaris) for corn. This variation is only offered to Ogum in the Casa Fanti Ashanti temple in São Luís, in the state of Maranhão. Feijoada, a stew of beans with beef and pork, is also a common offering to Ogum.

Santería and Palo

Ogun's centrality to the Yoruba religion has resulted in his name being retained in Santería religion, as well as the Shango religion of Trinidad and Tobago. In Santería, Ogún is syncretized with Saint Peter, James the Great, Saint Paul, and John the Baptist; he is the deity of war and metals.

Vodou

In Haitian Vodou Ogun is known as Ogou and consists of an array of manifestations; most carry the aspect of iron smithing and tools from the Yoruba tradition. The Ogou guard the badji, the sacred altar of the Vodou temple. He carries an iron saber and wears a red sash. Ogou is also the god of pioneering, intelligence, justice, medicine, and political power; these are associated with the symbol of the tool that can "advance humans' mastery over the environment. Ogou Feray is the god of war. Other manifestations of Ogou are Ogou Badagri, Ogou Balenjo, Ogou Batala, and Ogou Je Wouj. Ezili Dantor is the female counterpart to Ogou.

Ogou Feray is syncretized with St. James the Greater (St. Jacques Majeur) in the Vodou tradition. He is a flower spirit and he guides Vodou followers against their enemies. He is symbolically covered in iron and may not be harmed by his enemies. As in Africa, his symbol is a piece of iron, a machete, or a knife. As in Africa, Ogou is revered among blacksmiths, many of whom are of Yoruba origin. He is also noted to like women and alcohol.

In Vodou ceremonies followers of Ogou wear a red shirt, pants, and scarf. A follower of Ogou in a possession-trance is offered Haitian white rum during the ceremony. In some ceremonies rum is burned in a container to allow Ogou to "wash" the hands of the followers.

Two Vodou songs to Ogou, as recorded and translated by Michel S. Laguerre:

<blockquote>Fè Ogou Fè, Ogou Fèray o,
Fè Ogou Fè, Ogou Fèray o</p>

I am an iron,
I am covered with iron.</p></blockquote>

Fèrè Fèray tout ko Fèray sé kouto,
Fèrè Fèray tout ko Fèray sé manchèt.

The body of Ogou Fèray is covered with knives,
The body of Fèray is covered with machetes.

Footnotes

Léo Neto, et al. observed various kinds of animal used in sacrificial ritual in twelve Candomblé communities of Caruaru, Pernambuco and Campina Grande, Paraíba in the Northeastern region of Brazil between August 2007 and June 2008; dogs were the only sacrificial animal offered to Ogun in both communities.

Bibliography

References

15. Felix Kuadugah , contributor -Gu Worship Among the Ewe people 

Dahomean gods
Fire gods
Hunting gods
Santería
Smithing gods
Voodoo gods
War gods
Yoruba gods
Supernatural beings identified with Christian saints
Deities of wine and beer